Robert Lee Humber House is a historic home located at Greenville, Pitt County, North Carolina.  It was built in 1895, and is a -story, "T"-plan, frame dwelling with Queen Anne and Colonial Revival style design elements.  It has a one-story rear kitchen ell and a wraparound porch with Ionic order columns.

It was added to the National Register of Historic Places in 1981.

References

Houses on the National Register of Historic Places in North Carolina
Colonial Revival architecture in North Carolina
Queen Anne architecture in North Carolina
Houses completed in 1895
Houses in Pitt County, North Carolina
National Register of Historic Places in Greenville, North Carolina